The 1974 Christchurch mayoral election was part of the New Zealand local elections held that same year. In 1974, election were held for the Mayor of Christchurch plus other local government positions. The polling was conducted using the standard first-past-the-post electoral method. A significant change was the introduction of a ward system, with city councillors elected in five wards.

Background
Sitting mayor Neville Pickering was defeated by Citizens' councillor Hamish Hay in a closely fought race with a large turnout. Pickering actually increased his poll but the increased voter turnout favoured Hay leading The Press to state the result was out of increased interest rather than a swing of public opinion. It was the second consecutive election that an incumbent mayor had been defeated. The Citizens' Association regained their majority on the city council too, resulting in the composition of the council at eleven seats to eight.

Results
The final results were not released until 25 October; the following table gives the election results:

Ward results
Prior to the 1971 local elections, a local government commission had recommended that Christchurch amalgamate with some of the small surrounding local authorities and the area be divided into wards for electoral purposes, with the mayor then the only position elected at large. Pickering had promised during the 1971 election campaign that wards would be introduced for the 1974 local elections. The Citizens' ticket had also been in favour of introducing wards but tied this to amalgamation going ahead. Amalgamation did not proceed but the Labour-led council introduced five wards, the maximum number permitted by law, in time for the 1974 local elections. The central area, which had been known as Avon, was renamed to Pegasus to avoid confusion with the Avon general electorate, with the Pegasus ward electing four councillors. The other four wards were named after the cardinal points of the compass, electing four councillors each apart from the West ward with three councillors. Therefore, the total number of councillors at 19 remained unchanged.

The overall results of the ward elections to the Christchurch City Council was as follows.

The results per ward are shown in the following tables:

Aftermath
Councillor Massey, who represented the Pegasus ward, died in March 1975 and that triggered a by-election only because Christchurch had introduced the ward system for the 1974 election. Prior to that, when 19 councillors were elected at large, seats had just been left vacant. The Labour Party chose Buck to stand in the by-election. Aged 19, Buck won the by-election on 10 May 1975 by a large margin. She was New Zealand's youngest city councillor at that time.

References

Mayoral elections in Christchurch
1974 elections in New Zealand
Politics of Christchurch
October 1974 events in New Zealand
1970s in Christchurch